Zoe Lister-Jones (born September 1, 1982) is an American actress and filmmaker who co-starred as Jen Collins Short in the CBS sitcom Life in Pieces from 2015 to 2019. She is also known for her roles in the television shows Delocated (2009–2010), Whitney (2011–2013), and New Girl (2015). Lister-Jones made her directorial debut with the 2017 comedy-drama film Band Aid. In 2020, she wrote and directed the horror film The Craft: Legacy. She also co-wrote and co-directed the comedy-drama film How It Ends (2021) with Daryl Wein.

Early life and education
Lister-Jones was born in Brooklyn, New York City. Her mother is the Canadian-born and New York-based video artist Ardele Lister, and her father is the American photographer and media artist Bill Jones. Her mother was born to a Jewish family, whereas her father converted to Judaism. In 2000, she graduated from Edward R Murrow High School in Brooklyn. She graduated with honors from the Tisch School of the Arts at New York University and studied at the Royal Academy of Dramatic Arts in London. Lister-Jones performed with a rock band. Her mother was president of a local Conservative egalitarian synagogue that the family attended every Saturday, and she also kept a kosher home.

Career
Her debut solo CD was titled Skip the Kiss. Kyle Forester, who composed the score for Breaking Upwards, arranged the music for  Skip the Kiss. 

Lister-Jones' New York City theater credits include Seminar, The Little Dog Laughed and The New Group's The Accomplices. Her screen credits include the political thriller State of Play, Salt, The Other Guys, The Marconi Bros., Day Zero, as well as quirky independent films such as Armless, Arranged, and Palladio. On television she has appeared in Law & Order, Law & Order: Criminal Intent, Law & Order: SVU, Law & Order: Trial by Jury, on HBO's Bored to Death, as Kim on Adult Swim's Delocated, as Lily in the cast of the NBC sitcom Whitney, as Kate in Friends with Better Lives, as Councilwoman Fawn Moscato in New Girl, as Jen in Life in Pieces and as Carolyn Hart in the HBO film Confirmation.

In 2004, Lister-Jones wrote and performed the one-woman, ten-character show Co-dependence is a Four Letter Word at New York City's Performance Space 122 (P.S.122). 

In 2007, she appeared in the independent film, Arranged.

In 2009, Lister-Jones co-starred, co-produced (with Daryl Wein), and co-wrote (with Peter Duchan and Daryl Wein) the independent feature Breaking Upwards, which explores a young New York couple who, battling codependency, strategize their own break up. The film was shot in New York on a budget of $15,000, and was featured in a New York Times article as an example of sweat equity in the independent-film industry. Lister-Jones also wrote the lyrics and performed many of the tracks of the original motion picture sound track. Breaking Upwards premiered at the SXSW Film Festival in March, 2009.

Lister-Jones starred with Sam Rosen in Brady Kiernan's romantic drama Stuck Between Stations (2011) alongside Josh Hartnett and Michael Imperioli. Stuck Between Stations premiered as an official selection of the Viewpoints section at the SVA Theater at the 2011 Tribeca Film Festival in New York City, New York, U.S.A.

Lister-Jones starred in the independent feature film Lola Versus (2012), her second project co-written with director Daryl Wein. Distributed by Fox Searchlight Pictures, Lola Versus opened in theaters Summer 2012. It stars Greta Gerwig, Zoe Lister-Jones, Bill Pullman, Hamish Linklater, Debra Winger, Joel Kinnaman and Ebon Moss-Bachrach. Lola Versus premiered at New York's Tribeca Film Festival in April 2012.

Lister-Jones and Daryl Wein co-wrote Consumed (2015), their third feature-length collaboration directed by Wein. The political thriller, which focuses on the world of genetically modified organisms, began filming in May 2014 in Champaign-Urbana, Illinois with Shatterglass Studios. It stars Lister-Jones, Kunal Nayyar, Taylor Kinney, Victor Garber, Danny Glover, Griffin Dunne, Anthony Edwards, and Beth Grant. Consumed premiered at the Los Angeles Film Festival on June 15, 2015.

In 2017, Lister-Jones made her directorial debut with her indie film Band Aid, starring Lister-Jones, Adam Pally, Fred Armisen, Hannah Simone, Colin Hanks, Brooklyn Decker, Majandra Delfino, Jesse Williams, Susie Essman, Ravi Patel, Jamie Chung, Chris D’Elia, Retta, and Jerry O’Connell. The film features lyrics for original songs written by Lister-Jones and composed by Kyle Forester (Breaking Upwards). In 2020, she wrote and directed Columbia and Blumhouse's The Craft: Legacy, the sequel to the 1996 film The Craft.

Personal life
In 2013, Lister-Jones married her acting, writing and production partner Daryl Wein. In 2021, she announced that they had split after a 17-year-relationship. Lister-Jones described how they had been "in and out of an open relationship." 

In December 2021, Jones accused Chris Noth of sexually harassing her on the set of Law & Order: Criminal Intent in 2005.

Filmography

Film

Television

Theater

Broadway

Off Broadway

One-woman shows

References

External links
 
 

1982 births
21st-century American actresses
Actresses from New York City
21st-century American dramatists and playwrights
American film actresses
Screenwriters from New York (state)
American women film directors
American stage actresses
American television actresses
Jewish American actresses
Living people
People from Park Slope
Tisch School of the Arts alumni
American women dramatists and playwrights
21st-century American women writers
Film directors from New York City
21st-century American singers
21st-century American women singers
Edward R. Murrow High School alumni
21st-century American screenwriters